The NCAA Division II Men's Tennis Championship is an annual men's college tennis national collegiate championship sponsored by the National Collegiate Athletic Association (NCAA) for teams in Division II. 

Unlike the championships for Division I and Division III, this tournament crowns only a team champion. Individual and doubles titles were contested from 1963 to 1994 before being discontinued. 

Lander, with eight titles, is the most successful program. 

The current champions are Barry, who won their fifth title in 2021.

History
The championship first began in 1963 as the NCAA College Division Men's Tennis Championship for smaller colleges and universities not in the larger University Division (the precursor to the current Division I). The tournament gained its current name when the NCAA introduced its three-division structure in 1973–74. The national championship rounds are contested annually in May.

Champions

Singles, Doubles, and Team (Points) Championships (1963–1982)

Singles, Doubles, and Team (Bracket) Championships (1983–1994)

Team Championship Only (1995–present)

Champions

Team titles

Singles titles

Doubles titles

 Schools highlighted in pink are closed or no longer sponsor athletics.
 Schools highlight in yellow have reclassified to another NCAA division.

See also
NCAA Men's Tennis Championships (Division I, Division III)
NAIA Men's Tennis Championship
NCAA Women's Tennis Championships (Division I, Division II, Division III)

References

External links
NCAAsports.com
List of NCAA champions

Tennis Men
Tennis tournaments in the United States
College tennis in the United States